See El Mansurah (disambiguation) for other sites with similar names.

Al-Mansura was a small Palestinian Arab village in the Ramle Subdistrict, located 10 km south of Ramla.  It was depopulated during the 1947–48 Civil War in Mandatory Palestine on April 20, 1948, under Operation Barak.

History
In 1838, it was noted as a small  Muslim  village in the  Er-Ramleh District.

In 1863, Victor Guérin passed by, and noted a spring by the village.

In 1882, the PEF's Survey of Western Palestine  noted it as an adobe village of "moderate size."

British Mandate era
In the 1922 census of Palestine, conducted by the British Mandate authorities, Mansura   had a population of 31, all  Muslims,  increasing in the 1931 census to 61, still all Muslims, in a total of 14 houses.

In  the 1945 statistics, the village had a population of 90, all Muslim, and the total land area was 2,328  dunums. Of this, Arabs used 2,113 dunums for cereals,  while 3 dunams were classified as built-up urban areas.

1948, aftermath
Al-Mansura was depopulated on April 20, 1948, after a military assault.

In 1992 it was described: "The site is planted with sycamore trees and there are also cactuses growing on it. The surrounding land is cultivated by the settlers of Mazkeret Batya, this settlement was founded [] on land belonging to  Aqir."

References

Bibliography

External links
Welcome To al-Mansura
al-Mansura (Ramla), Zochrot
Survey of Western Palestine, Map 16:   IAA, Wikimedia commons  
al-Mansura, from the Khalil Sakakini Cultural Center

Arab villages depopulated during the 1948 Arab–Israeli War
District of Ramla